Claudio Omar Turco García (born 24 August 1963 in Buenos Aires, Argentina) is an Argentine former international footballer who played as a winger.

García started his professional career in 1981 with Club Atlético Huracán in Buenos Aires. He stayed with the club until their relegation from the Argentine Primera at the end of the 1985-1986 season.

García joined Vélez Sársfield where he played until 1988, then signed for Lyon in France.

In 1991 García returned to Argentine football to join Racing Club de Avellaneda. He was also given his debut for the Argentina national team in 1991. He was part of two Copa América winning campaigns in 1991 and 1993.

García played over 100 games for Racing Club between 1991 and his departure in 1995. He joined Colón de Santa Fe where he spent one season before returning to Huracán in 1996. By the end of his second spell at Huracán he had made 251 appearances, scoring 51 goals.

Towards the end of his playing days he spent time with All Boys and Independiente Rivadavia in the Argentine 2nd Division and Chacarita Juniors. In 2001, he joined Spanish lower league side Real Jaen.

Coaching career

Since his retirement as a player García has worked as a football manager on a couple of occasions, with Defensores Unidos and Independiente Rivadavia. Currently, he is the manager of Talleres (RE).

Reality shows career

Honours

Player

International
Argentina
Copa América: 1991, 1993
FIFA Confederations Cup: 1992

External links

 Argentine Primera statistics

1963 births
Living people
Argentine footballers
Argentina youth international footballers
Argentina under-20 international footballers
Argentina international footballers
Footballers from Buenos Aires
1991 Copa América players
1992 King Fahd Cup players
1993 Copa América players
Copa América-winning players
FIFA Confederations Cup-winning players
Association football forwards
Argentine Primera División players
Club Atlético Huracán footballers
Club Atlético Vélez Sarsfield footballers
Olympique Lyonnais players
Racing Club de Avellaneda footballers
Club Atlético Colón footballers
All Boys footballers
Chacarita Juniors footballers
Independiente Rivadavia footballers
Real Jaén footballers
Argentine football managers
Talleres de Remedios de Escalada managers
Independiente Rivadavia managers
Argentine expatriate footballers
Ligue 1 players
Expatriate footballers in France
Argentine expatriate sportspeople in France
Argentine expatriate sportspeople in Spain